Abdulrahman Ibrahim Al-Jassim (born 14 October 1987) is a Qatari football referee who has been a full international referee for FIFA since 2013.

Career 
He was one of the referees for the 2017 FIFA U-20 World Cup in South Korea. Al-Jassim was appointed to be a Video Assistant Referee for the 2018 FIFA World Cup in Russia. Al-Jassim was also appointed to be a referee at the 2019 AFC Asian Cup in the United Arab Emirates. He was also the 2020 AFC Champions League Final referee. In June 2019 it was announced that Al-Jassim would officiate in the 2019 CONCACAF Gold Cup as part of a referee exchange program between CONCACAF and the AFC, which had previously seen Mexican referee César Arturo Ramos in the 2019 AFC Asian Cup. The FIFA Referees Committee appointed Abdulrahman for 2019 FIFA Club World Cup in Qatar on 14 November as part of an all-Qatari trio of officials. He officiated the final between Liverpool and Flamengo at the Khalifa International Stadium in Doha. He was appointed to the referee team for the 2022 FIFA World Cup, in his native Qatar.

Record

References

External links 
 

Living people
1987 births
Qatari football referees
2018 FIFA World Cup referees
2022 FIFA World Cup referees
FIFA World Cup referees
AFC Asian Cup referees
CONCACAF Gold Cup referees